Salvador Guardiola Torá (born 5 September 1988) is a Spanish cyclist, who currently rides for UCI Continental team .

Major results

2012
 10th Overall Tour of Greece
2014
 8th Tour de Okinawa
2015
 3rd Overall Tour de Hokkaido
2016
 5th Overall Sharjah International Cycling Tour
 7th Overall Tour de Filipinas
 9th UAE Cup
2017
 4th Klasika Primavera
 5th Overall Tour de Tochigi
1st Stage 1
 5th Overall Tour of China II
 6th Overall Tour de Hokkaido
 7th Overall Tour de Filipinas
 9th Overall Tour de Korea
2018
 5th Overall Tour de Kumano
 9th Overall Tour de Ijen
2019
 4th Overall Tour of Thailand
 6th Overall Tour de Siak

References

External links

1988 births
Living people
Spanish male cyclists
Cyclists from the Region of Murcia